Sol was a Canadian indie rock band in the 1990s. From Moncton, New Brunswick, the band consisted of singer and bassist Stacy Ricker, guitarist Robin Anne Ettles and drummer Chris Mersereau.

They released their first indie EP, Small Vacations, in 1996. That same year, they also performed a rendition of "Blue Tattoo" on A Tribute to Hard Core Logo. In 1997, they released their full-length debut, Lucinda.

The band played locally in New Brunswick and toured Canada several times, and had singles on campus and community radio. They won an East Coast Music Award for Best Alternative Artist in 1999, but disbanded due to creative differences the same year. A live album was released in 2000.

All three members continue to make music on their own.

References

External links
Canadian Indie Band Database Sol

Musical groups with year of establishment missing
Musical groups from Moncton
Canadian indie rock groups
Canadian alternative rock groups
1996 establishments in New Brunswick
1999 disestablishments in Canada